Granica is a village situated in Bojnik municipality in Serbia.

References

Populated places in Jablanica District
Bojnik